Melangyna lasiophthalma is a Holarctic species of hoverfly.

Description
External images
For terms see Morphology of Diptera
Wing length 7-9·25 mm. Facial prominence projecting well beyond frontal prominence. Post-orbital strip wide. scutellar hairs mostly yellow towards anterior margin. Long hairs on general body surface black and brownish-yellow. The male terminalia are figured by Hippa (1968) ).
See references for determination.

Distribution
Palearctic from Iceland and Fennoscandia South to the Pyrenees and mountains of Spain. Ireland East through North Europe and mountainous parts of Central Europe. East into European Russia and Siberia. Nearctic from Alaska south to Colorado and Maryland.

Biology
Habitat: Quercus forest, Fraxinus and Salix gallery woods along rivers, Alnus, Salix, Betula forests, Abies and Picea forest, Atlantic scrub, hedgerows, suburban gardens, parks and orchards. Flowers visited include Acer pseudoplatanus, Alnus glutinosa, Anemone nemorosa, Anthriscus, Caltha, Chrysosplenium oppositifolium, Corylus avellana, Euphorbia, Ilex, Lonicera xylosteum, Narcissus, Oxalis, Prunus laurocerasus, Prunus spinosa, Ranunculus, Salix, Sambucus, Sorbus aucuparia, Taraxacum, Tussilago, Ulex. The flight period is March to June (later at higher altitudes and more northerly latitudes.

References

Diptera of Europe
Syrphinae
Insects described in 1843